Girls' Generation Asia Tour "Into the New World" is the first Asian concert tour of South Korean girl group Girls' Generation. It commenced with two shows in December 2009 in Seoul, followed by two encore shows in February 2010, before the Asian legs in Shanghai and Taipei. Additionally, on August 25, 2010, the group visited Tokyo, Japan for their Premium Showcase Live in Ariake Colosseum. This was their first ever concert performance in Japan, and it launched their debut in Japan.

Overview
The tour was announced by S.M. Entertainment in November 2009. The tickets for the tour went on sale on November 19, and they were sold out in 3 minutes.

At the Taipei Arena concert in Taiwan on the 16th and 17th, around 24,000 people attended. The tickets to both of Girls' Generation concerts were sold out, establishing a record for having the most people in attendance for a foreign female artist (at that time).

The tour initially consisted of two Korean shows on December 19 and 20, 2009. It was later announced that the group would play two "Encore" shows on February 27 and 28, 2010. The Encore concert on February 27 and 28 was different from their concert in December 2009, in terms of set list. Super Junior member Eunhyuk was set to appear as a guest at the encore concert but had to pull out because he was diagnosed with H1N1 influenza on February 26 thus replaced by Leeteuk and Heechul. 

The concert in Bangkok, originally scheduled for July 24, 2010, was postponed indefinitely due to the 2010 Thai political protests. The live album Into the New World was recorded in Seoul released on December 30, 2010, in South Korea.

Set list
{{hidden
| headercss = background: #ccccff; font-size: 100%; width: 65%;
| contentcss = text-align: left; font-size: 100%; width: 75%;
| header = South Korea ( December 19/20, 2009)
| content = Main Set:
 "소원을 말해봐" ("Tell Me Your Wish (Genie)") (Remix)
 "Show! Show! Show!"
 "소녀시대" ("Girls' Generation")
 "Beginning" (Remix)
 "It's Fantastic"
 "Etude"
 "울랄라" ("Ooh La La")
 "Kissing You" (Remix)
 "One Year Later" (Jessica and Onew)
 "Umbrella" (Tiffany's solo)
 "Hush Hush" (Taeyeon's solo)
 "좋은 사람 소개시켜줘 ("Introduce Me a Good Person") (Yoona's solo feat. Shindong & Eunhyuk)
 "Sunny" (Sunny's solo)
 "Chocolate Love"
 "Destiny"
 "Honey"
 "Merry Go Round"
 "Dear. Mom"
 "Day by Day"
 "동화" ("My Child")
 "Barbie Girl" (Jessica's solo feat. Key)
 "Santa Baby" (Sooyoung's solo)
 "16 Going on 17" (Seohyun's solo)
 "Singin' in the Rain"
 "Over the Rainbow"
 "Chu~♡" f(x)
 "1, 2 Step" (Yuri's solo feat. Amber)
 "Tell Me Your Wish" (Poppin Remix) and "Tipsy" (Hyoyeon's dance solo)
 ""Rhythm Nation" (Dance Battle feat. Yoona, Sooyoung, Yuri & Hyoyeon)
 "다시만난세계" ("Into the New World")
 "Be Happy"
 "힘내" ("Him Nae (Way to Go)")
 "Gee"
 "Touch the Sky"

Encore:
 "앵콜첫곡" ("Naengmyun")
 "하하하송" ("HaHaHa")
 "Complete"
 "더블앵콜" ("Baby Baby")
 "Oh!"
}}

Tour dates

DVD

Girls' Generation 1st Asia Tour: Into the New World is the fourth DVD release from South Korean girl group Girls' Generation. It was released on August 18, 2011, in South Korea.

History
Girls' Generation kicked off their first Asia tour Into the New World in Seoul on December 19–20, 2009. The two-disc concert release is a live recording of their February 2010 encore concert at Seoul's Olympic Park Fencing Stadium. Other than performing hits like Gee, Genie, Chocolate Love, and Baby Baby, the DVD contains special performances and solo stages, including Sooyoung Santa Baby, Taeyeon Hush Hush, Sunny's Sunny, Yuri's 1, 2 Step, Yoona "Introduce Me a Good Man", Jessica and Tiffany's duet Caramel Coffee, Seo Hyun's Sixteen Going on Seventeen, and Hyoyeon's dance special.

The DVD set includes making-of features (rehearsal, backstage, interview) and a concert photobook.

Track list

Release history

References

Girls' Generation concert tours
2009 concert tours
2010 concert tours
Girls' Generation video albums
Concert tours of Asia